Tolypella nidifica is a species of stonewort belonging to the family Characeae.

It has almost cosmopolitan distribution.

References

Charophyta